Piano Love Songs is the 13th studio album released by Bradley Joseph on the Robbins Island Music label.

Track listing
"The Way You Look Tonight" –  Writers:  Jerome Kern, Dorothy Fields  –  4:45
"Unforgettable" –  Writer:  Irving Gordon  –  4:32
"The First Time Ever I Saw Your Face" –  Writer: Ewan MacColl –  4:30
"Fields of Gold" –  Writer:  Sting –  4:05
"I Got You Babe" (Sonny and Cher) –  Writer: Sonny Bono  –   4:50
"You Are So Beautiful"  –  Writers:  Billy Preston, Bruce Fisher  –  4:05
"Moon River" –  Writers:  –  Henry Mancini, Johnny Mercer  –  4:58
"My Funny Valentine"  –  Writers: Lorenz Hart, Richard Rodgers –  5:36
"The Wedding Song (There is Love)" –   Writer: Noel Stookey –  4:30
"Moonlight Sonata" (Beethoven / (classical) –  Arranger:  Bradley Joseph  –   6:49
"Forever I Do"  –   Writer:  Bradley Joseph  –   3:54
"For Your Eyes Only"  (Sheena Easton)  –   Writer: Bill Conti –   4:58
"Canon in D  (Pachelbel / (classical) –  Arranger:  Bradley Joseph  –   5:16

Personnel
All music arranged and performed by Bradley Joseph.
Art and Design – Tony Horning
Portrait Photography – J. Dunn

References

External links
Official Website
Piano Love Songs at Discogs
Famous Piano Songs of All Times There is a wide range of famous piano songs belonging to varied genres that one can listen to, learn and enjoy to play.

2006 albums
Bradley Joseph albums
Covers albums